The Arcfox Lite is an all-electric microcar manufactured by BAIC under the Arcfox brand.

Overview 

In 2016, the Chinese automaker BAIC Group introduced the pre-production Lite R300 model, which was originally intended to power the BJEV electric car sub-brand. Ultimately, the car went on sale under the newly established Arcfox brand at the end of 2017, as another model with electrically powered microcars steadily gaining popularity in China.

In terms of design, the Lite adopts the avant-garde form of a hatchback with a short, stepped rear and two-color body paint, as well as a distinctive, luminous strip between the headlights.

Specifications 
The Lite's electrical system is co-created by a 16.4 kWh battery, developing a total power of 49 hp and a maximum torque of 120 Nm. The maximum range of the vehicle on a single charge is approximately 150 kilometers.

References 

Arcfox vehicles
Cars introduced in 2017
Production electric cars
Microcars
2020s cars